Étienne Henri Clement Joseph Guibel (7 August 1905 – 2 February 1989) was a French field hockey player who competed in the 1936 Summer Olympics.

He was a member of the French field hockey team, which finish fourth in the 1936 Olympic tournament. He played one match as goalkeeper.

References

External links
 
Étienne Guibel's profile at Sports Reference.com

1905 births
1989 deaths
French male field hockey players
Olympic field hockey players of France
Field hockey players at the 1936 Summer Olympics
20th-century French people